Drake is a city in McHenry County, North Dakota, United States. The population was 292 at the 2020 census. It is part of the Minot Micropolitan Statistical Area. Drake was founded in 1902 and named after Herman Drake, a settler.

Geography
Drake is located at  (47.923793, -100.371284)

Demographics

2010 census
As of the census of 2010, there were 275 people, 144 households, and 70 families residing in the city. The racial makeup of the city was 97.8% White, 0.4% Native American, and 1.8% from two or more races. Hispanic or Latino of any race were 2.5% of the population.

There were 144 households, of which 17.4% had children under the age of 18 living with them, 39.6% were married couples living together, 5.6% had a female householder with no husband present, 3.5% had a male householder with no wife present, and 51.4% were non-families. 44.4% of all households were made up of individuals, and 27% had someone living alone who was 65 years of age or older. The average household size was 1.91 and the average family size was 2.70.

The median age in the city was 48.1 years. 17.8% of residents were under the age of 18; 4.7% were between the ages of 18 and 24; 23.7% were from 25 to 44; 26.2% were from 45 to 64; and 27.6% were 65 years of age or older. The gender makeup of the city was 50.5% male and 49.5% female.

2000 census
As of the census of 2000, there were 322 people, 164 households, and 94 families residing in the city. The population density was 163.1 people per square mile (63.1/km2). There were 201 housing units at an average density of 101.8 per square mile (39.4/km2). The racial makeup of the city was 100.00% White. Hispanic or Latino of any race were 0.31% of the population.

There were 164 households, out of which 18.9% had children under the age of 18 living with them, 47.0% were married couples living together, 9.8% had a female householder with no husband present, and 42.1% were non-families. 38.4% of all households were made up of individuals, and 23.8% had someone living alone who was 65 years of age or older. The average household size was 1.96 and the average family size was 2.60.

In the city, the population was spread out, with 18.3% under the age of 18, 4.0% from 18 to 24, 19.3% from 25 to 44, 22.7% from 45 to 64, and 35.7% who were 65 years of age or older. The median age was 51 years. For every 100 females, there were 97.5 males. For every 100 females age 18 and over, there were 87.9 males.

The median income for a household in the city was $22,813, and the median income for a family was $34,844. Males had a median income of $23,250 versus $17,083 for females. The per capita income for the city was $13,023. About 8.2% of families and 15.2% of the population were below the poverty line, including 18.3% of those under age 18 and 16.3% of those age 65 or over.

Book burning controversy
The school board ordered books considered obscene, including Slaughterhouse Five by Kurt Vonnegut and Deliverance by James Dickey, assigned to the sophomore English class, be confiscated and burned in 1973. The resulting national controversy surrounding burning 32 copies of Slaughterhouse Five resulted in an out of court settlement, including permission for the work to be taught to high school juniors and seniors.

Climate
This climatic region is typified by large seasonal temperature differences, with warm to hot (and often humid) summers and cold (sometimes severely cold) winters.  According to the Köppen Climate Classification system, Drake has a humid continental climate, abbreviated "Dfb" on climate maps.

In popular culture
In Dr. Seuss's classic children's book Horton Hatches the Egg, Horton the Elephant visits Drake while he is in the circus.

References

Cities in North Dakota
Cities in McHenry County, North Dakota
Populated places established in 1902
1902 establishments in North Dakota
Minot, North Dakota micropolitan area